The 1916 Illinois lieutenant gubernatorial election was held on November 7, 1916. It saw the election of  Republican former governor John G. Oglesby to a second nonconsecutive term.

Primary elections
Primary elections were held on September 13, 1916.

Democratic primary

Candidates
Henry W. Huttmann
Barratt O'Hara, incumbent Lieutenant Governor

Results

Republican primary

Candidates
William J. Butler
Frank Hall Childs
Albert W. Cohn
Frederick C. DeLang
Albert Goodman
Sam W. Latham, incumbent State Senator
John G. Oglesby, former Lieutenant Governor

Results

Progressive primary
No candidates stood in the Progressive Party'sprimary, and the Progressive Party did not field a candidate in the general election.

Results

Socialist primary

Candidates
Karl F. M. Sandberg

Results

General election

Candidates
Harvey A. DuBois, Prohibition, candidate for Illinois Secretary of State in 1908
Henry W. Huttmann, Democratic
Gustave A. Jennings, Socialist Labor, candidate for Governor in 1908
John G. Oglesby, Republican
Karl F. M. Sandberg, Socialist

Results

See also
1916 Illinois gubernatorial election

References

Bibliography
 

1916
lieutenant gubernatorial
Illinois
November 1916 events